Events from the year 1669 in Sweden

Incumbents
 Monarch – Charles XI

Events

 Gothenburg burns down. 
 Margareta Beijer becomes the second female manager of the Swedish Post Office. 
 The trial against the conversion of Christina Eleonora Drakenhielm.
 The Mora witch trial is conducted.

Births

 24 May - Emerentia von Düben, royal favorite  (died 1743) 
 Gustaf von Psilander, admiral (died 1738)

Deaths

 April 23 - Johannes Canuti Lenaeus, archbishop (born 1573) 
 15 May - Margareta Brahe, controversial countess and courtier  (born 1603) 
 unknown date - Margareta Slots, royal mistress  (born unknown) 
 22 October - Sigrid Banér, Swedish letter writer (born 1592)

References

 
Years of the 17th century in Sweden
Sweden